CA-EZTEST was a CICS interactive test/debug software package distributed by Computer Associates and originally called EZTEST/CICS, produced by Capex Corporation of Phoenix, Arizona with assistance from Ken Dakin from England.
 
The product provided source level test and debugging features for computer programs written in COBOL, PL/I and Assembler (BAL) languages to complement their own existing COBOL optimizer product.

Competition
CA-EZTEST initially competed with three rival products:

 "Intertest" originally from On-line Software International, based in the United States.  In 1991, Computer Associates International, Inc. acquired On-line Software and renamed the product CA-INTERTEST, then stopped selling CA-EZTEST.
 OLIVER (CICS interactive test/debug) from Advanced Programming Techniques in the UK.
 XPEDITER from Compuware Corporation who in 1994 acquired the OLIVER product.

Early critical role
Between them, these three products provided much needed third-party system software support for IBM's "flagship" teleprocessing product CICS, which survived for more than 20 years as a strategic product without any memory protection of its own. A single "rogue" application program (frequently by a buffer overflow) could accidentally overwrite data almost anywhere in the address space causing "down-time" for the entire teleprocessing system, possibly supporting thousands of remote terminals. This was despite the fact that much of the world's banking and other commerce relied heavily on CICS for secure transaction processing between 1970 and early 1990s.  The difficulty in deciding which application program caused the problem was often insurmountable and frequently the system would be restarted without spending many hours investigated very large (and initially unformatted) "core dump"s requiring expert system programming support and knowledge.

Early integrated testing environment
Additionally, the product (and its competitors) provided an integrated testing environment which was not provided by IBM for early versions of CICS and which was only partially satisfied with their later embedded testing tool — "Execution Diagnostic Facility" (EDF), which only helped newer "Command level" programmers and provided no protection.

Supported operating systems
The following operating systems were supported:

 IBM MVS
 IBM XA
 IBM VSE (except XPEDITER)

References

External links
 IBM CICS official website
 Xpediter — Interactive mainframe analysis and debugging
 Xpeditor/CICS users guide for COBOL for OS/390 (Release 2.5 or above) and z/OS, September 2004
 CA Inc. — product description for CA-Intertest

Software testing
Debuggers
CA Technologies
IBM mainframe software